Philip Waller (born 12 April 1943) is an English former professional footballer who played in the Football League for Derby County and Mansfield Town.

References

1943 births
Living people
English footballers
Association football defenders
English Football League players
Derby County F.C. players
Mansfield Town F.C. players
Ilkeston Town F.C. (1945) players
Boston United F.C. players
Matlock Town F.C. players
Burton Albion F.C. players
Belper Town F.C. players
Kimberley Town F.C. players
Ashfield United F.C. players
Footballers from Leeds